Joseph Rakotoarimanana (born 6 October 1972) is a retired Malagasy athlete who specialized in the 800 metres.

Competing at the 1996 Summer Olympics, he set his career best time of 1:47.33 minutes in the heats. This is the current Malagasy record. He also competed at the 1997 World Indoor Championships and the 1997 World Championships without progressing from the heats.

References

External links

1972 births
Living people
Malagasy male middle-distance runners
Athletes (track and field) at the 1996 Summer Olympics
Olympic athletes of Madagascar